Moazzam Jah, Walashan Shahzada Nawab Mir Sir Shuja’at ‘Ali Khan Siddiqui Bahadur, KCIE (21 December 1907 – 15 September 1987), was the son of the last Nizam of Hyderabad, Osman Ali Khan, Asaf Jah VII and his first wife Dulhan Pasha Begum.

He first married Princess Niloufer (4 January 1916 – 12 June 1989), one of the last princesses of the Ottoman empire. He later had two other wives, Anwari Begum Saheba and Razia Begum Saheba. In 1947, he was granted the personal style of Highness by the King-Emperor George VI.

He was a poetry enthusiast who had close ties with the poet Najm Afandi after the latter moved from Agra to Hyderabad State. The Prince also wrote poetry under the pen name Shahji.

Jah stayed at the Hill Fort Palace, Hyderabad.

The popular Moazzam Jahi Market of Hyderabad is named after him.

Early life
Jah was born as Mir Shujaat Ali Khan on 2 January 1908. His father was Mir Osman Ali Khan, the last Nizam of Hyderabad State of British India. Jah's mother Dulhan Pasha Begum was the first wife of Osman Ali Khan. Jah had an elder brother Azam Jah.

During his youth, Jah was popularly known as  Junior Prince. He received an annual grant from his father, the Nizam.

Poet
Jah composed Urdu poems and ghazals under the pseudonym "Shaji". He set up his own court of poetry in the Hill Fort Palace in which around 30 Urdu poets from as far as Lucknow and Delhi. The poets used to arrive at his court during the evening. A dinner was held at midnight. Jah used to recite the poems composed by himself at the court. After him, the other poets used to recite their own. It continued until the adhan (Islamic call to prayer) of the Fajr prayer.

Personal life
On 12 November 1931, Jah married Niloufer, aged 15, a princess of the Ottoman Empire at Nice in France. On the same day, Jah's elder brother Azam Jah married Niloufer's cousin Durru Shehvar. These weddings were held as "union of two great dynasties" by contemporary records. Niloufer's inability to bear any child strained their marriage. In 1952, after 21 years of marriage, they officially divorced.

In 1948, Jah married for a second time to Razia Begum, after separation from Princess Niloufer. Prince Moazzam Jah has a grandson Himayat Ali Mirza who was also involved in handing over of Nizam's jewels to the Government of India in 1990s.

Titles

1907-1929: Moazzam Jah, Walashan Shahzada Nawab Mir Shuja’at ‘Ali Khan Bahadur
1929-1945: Colonel Moazzam Jah, Walashan Shahzada Nawab Mir Shuja’at ‘Ali Khan Bahadur
1945-1946: General Moazzam Jah, Walashan Shahzada Nawab Mir Shuja’at ‘Ali Khan Bahadur
1946-1947: General Moazzam Jah, Walashan Shahzada Nawab Mir Sir Shuja’at ‘Ali Khan Bahadur, KCIE
1947-1987: General His Highness Moazzam Jah, Walashan Shahzada Nawab Mir Sir Shuja’at ‘Ali Khan Bahadur, KCIE

Honours

(ribbon bar, as it would look today; incomplete)

King George V Silver Jubilee Medal-1935
King George VI Coronation Medal-1937
Nizam Silver Jubilee Medal (mil.)-1937
Tunis Victory Medal-1942
Hyderabad War Medal-1945
Knight Commander of the Order of the Indian Empire (KCIE)-1946

References

External links
TIME magazine feature

People from Hyderabad State
Indian knights
20th-century Indian royalty
1907 births
1987 deaths
Knights Commander of the Order of the Indian Empire
Asaf Jahi dynasty